Eric Leonard (born October 5, 1995) is an American soccer player who plays as a defender for MLS Next Pro club Chicago Fire FC II.

Career

Youth and college career
In addition to playing for William Fremd High School, Leonard also served as the captain for the Sockers FC Chicago development academy. In 2014, he joined Butler University, making 73 appearances and scoring 6 goals for the Bulldogs during his four seasons. He was named to the Big East All-Rookie Team in his freshman year, and twice was included in the division's All-Tournament Team in 2016 and 2017. He also served as the team's captain in his senior year.

OKC Energy U23
Leonard joined the OKC Energy U23 team of the PDL in 2017. He made 13 regular season appearances, scoring one goal, along with one appearance in the play-offs.

Nerang Eagles
In 2018, Leonard joined Australian club Nerang Eagles in the Gold Coast Premier League. At the end of the season, he won the Gold Coast Premier League Players' Player of the Year award.

Forward Madison FC
In December 2018, Forward Madison FC announced the signing of Leonard for the team's inaugural season in 2019. He made his league debut for the club on April 13, 2019, coming on as an 81st minute substitute for Josiel Núñez in a 1-0 away defeat to North Texas SC.

Leonard is Forward Madison's all-time appearance leader, with 99 appearances across all competitive competitions.

Chicago Fire FC II
On December 13, 2022, Leonard was transferred from Forward Madison FC to the Chicago Fire FC organization. Details of the transfer were not disclosed. It was later reported that Leonard would start with Chicago Fire FC II of MLS Next Pro.

Personal life
Leonard was born in Palatine, Illinois, a suburb of Chicago.

References

External links
 
 
 

1995 births
Living people
People from Palatine, Illinois
Sportspeople from Cook County, Illinois
Soccer players from Illinois
American soccer players
American expatriate soccer players
American expatriate sportspeople in Australia
Expatriate soccer players in Australia
Association football midfielders
Butler Bulldogs men's soccer players
OKC Energy FC players
Forward Madison FC players
Chicago Fire FC II players
USL League One players
USL League Two players
MLS Next Pro players